Kachin State Hluttaw is the legislature of Kachin State in Myanmar (Burma). It is a unicameral body, consisting of 53 members, including 40 elected members and 13 military representatives.   As of February 2016, the Hluttaw was led by speaker Tun Tin of the National League for Democracy (NLD).

General Election results (Nov. 2015)

2015 results are as of 20 November 2015. 4 Ethnic Affair Ministers posts won by NLD's candidates are included in total 26 seats.

See also
State and Region Hluttaws
Pyidaungsu Hluttaw

References

Unicameral legislatures
Kachin State
Legislatures of Burmese states and regions